Desperacja is a Polish historical film, released in 1988. Set in 1862, Colonel Huber, of the Warsaw Tsarist police investigates the Polish underground.

Cast 
 Maria Krawczyk as Katarzyna Zaborowska
 Krzysztof Ibisz as Marcin
 Janusz Zakrzeński as colonel Huber
 Leszek Zdybał as major Dymitr Woroncow
 Piotr Zawadzki as Władysław Daniłowski
 Cezary Nowak as Adam Asnyk
 Bogusław Semotiuk as Włodzimierz Wolski
 Krzysztof Kaczmarek as Wiciak
 Wojciech Asiński as Bareta
 Zbigniew Bogdański as Abramowicz
 Michał Szewczuk as spy

References

External links
 

1988 films
Polish historical films
1980s Polish-language films
1980s historical films